Popular Mechanics is the debut album by English experimental rock band Piano Magic. It was originally released in 1997 on I/Ché Trading records and then again by Rocket Girl in 2003.

It was recorded in North London by founding members Glen Johnson and Dominic Chennell with contributions from passing friends. At the time, Johnson and Chennell claimed the album to be influenced by the early music of Kraftwerk and Brothers Quay animation films.

Reception
The album was favourably received by both home and international press. David Hemingway's review in The Wire sums up with "Few other releases occupy this fertile middle ground between ambience and experimentation, between pop and abstraction, and none I know succeeds with such effortless finesse. Highly recommended". While Mark Luffman's review in Melody Maker concludes with (in a nod to the lyrics of Wintersort/Cross Country) "Things simply couldn't be finer."

Ngaire-Ruth's review in Vox magazine goes further and claims the album "significantly redefined our means of cultural expression."

Opponents 
While a definite outlier, Angela Lewis in The Independent newspaper is less enthusiastic finding the band's "moody obscurity ... for the art-school crowd and physics students only."

Recording
The album was recorded in their shared North London home by founding members Glen Johnson and Dominic Chennell with contributions from passing friends. An 8 track cassette machine was borrowed from band Urusei Yatsura to make the album recordings.

Music
At the time, Johnson and Chennell claimed the album to be influenced by the early music of Kraftwerk and Brothers Quay animation films and was described by record label Rocket Girl as 'minimalist mood music with whirring keyboards, small beats and the effective deployment of brittle, doll-like voices.". This was reflected by The Wire magazine who reported the music as "ethereal electronic pop and atmospheric soundscapes" and as the band themselves calling it "pre-chip .. radiophonic".

There is evidence of field recordings or 'found sounds' throughout including dripping taps, bird song and ticking clocks.

The album includes the a-sides from Piano Magic's first two single releases, Wrong French and Wintersport featuring the third founding member Dick Rance.

Sleeve 
The album front cover shows a grassy bank in front of an anonymous modern building. The reverse cover and internal booklet (CD) and inner sleeve (vinyl) appear to show intimate household details including a kitchen tap; a flaking wall; a knife and spoon (CD only) in high contrast colours.

Dominic Chennell is credited with 'photography'.  Lyrics are included in both vinyl and CD editions with Glen Johnson credited with "words".

Track listing

Vinyl edition

CD edition

Lineup 
Glen Johnson – Sounds / Words
Dominic Chennell – Sounds / Photography
Martin Cooper – Sounds
David Griffiths – Sounds
Dick Rance – Sounds
Paul Tornbohm – Sounds
Hazel Burfitt – Voice
Rachel Leigh – Voice

References

1997 albums
Piano Magic albums